The 2008 Southern Conference baseball tournament was held at Joseph P. Riley Jr. Park in Charleston, South Carolina, from May 20 through 24. Top seeded  won the tournament and earned the Southern Conference's automatic bid to the 2008 NCAA Division I baseball tournament. It was Elon's first SoCon tournament win. Elon joined the conference beginning with the 2004 baseball season.

All ten baseball programs in the conference participated in the tournament, with the seventh through tenth place teams playing a single-elimination opening day prior to an 8-team, two bracket, double-elimination tournament.

Seeding

Bracket

Play-In Round

Bracket One

Bracket Two

Final

Game Summaries

Play-In Round

Round One

Round Two

Round Three

Semifinals

Final

All-Tournament Team

References 

Tournament
Southern Conference Baseball Tournament
SoCon baseball tournament
Southern Conference baseball tournament